Eugène Telotte (born 13 November 1926) was a French racing cyclist. He rode in the 1952 Tour de France.

References

External links
  

1926 births
Possibly living people
French male cyclists
Place of birth missing (living people)